Kay Kaufman Shelemay is the G. Gordon Watts Professor of Music and Professor of African and African American Studies at Harvard University. She received her PhD in Musicology from the University of Michigan and won a Guggenheim Fellowship in 2007. Shelemay was elected to the American Philosophical Society in 2013.

Works
 Music, Ritual, and Falasha History (1986)
 ed. Garland Library of Readings in Ethnomusicology (Garland Publishing, 7 vols., 1990)
 A Song of Longing: An Ethiopian Journey (1991)
 Ethiopian Christian Chant: An Anthology with Peter Jeffery (3 vols., 1993–97) 
 Let Jasmine Rain Down: Song and Remembrance Among Syrian Jews (University of Chicago Press, 1998)
 ed. Studies in Jewish Musical Traditions (2001) 
 Soundscapes: Exploring Music in a Changing World (W.W. Norton, second edition 2006)
 co-ed. Pain and its Transformations: The Interface of Biology and Culture with Sarah Coakley (Harvard University Press, 2007)
 Sing and Sing On: Sentinel Musicians and the Making of the Ethiopian American Diaspora. University of Chicago Press, 2022.

References

Living people
American musicologists
Year of birth missing (living people)
Harvard University faculty
Members of the American Philosophical Society
Ethiopianists